The Diocese of Rio Grande is a Roman Catholic diocese located in the city of Rio Grande in the Ecclesiastical province of Pelotas in Brazil. The Diocese was established from the Diocese of Pelotas in 1971 and is located at the Cathedral of Saint Peter in Rio Grande.

Bishops
  (1971–1986)
  (1986–2016)
  (2016–Present)

References
 GCatholic.org
 Catholic Hierarchy

Roman Catholic dioceses in Brazil
Christian organizations established in 1971
Rio Grande, Roman Catholic Diocese of
Roman Catholic dioceses and prelatures established in the 20th century